Enos Briggs (1746–1819)  was an American shipbuilder.

Life 
He was born on July 20, 1746, in Pembroke, Massachusetts.

He was the son of Seth Briggs, another shipbuilder.

He died in Salem, Massachusetts in 1819.

Career 
He is most famous for being the builder of the warship  on Winter Island in Salem, which was captured by the British in the War of 1812.

Other notable ships built by him include the Grank Turk and the Friendship.

Some of his well-known customers were Elias Derby, Joseph Peabody, Simon Forrester and George Crowninshield.

References

External links
 

American businesspeople
1819 deaths
Shipbuilders
Boat builders